David Bolton (born 13 July 1960) is a former Australian rules footballer who played for Geelong and Sydney in the Victorian/Australian Football League (VFL/AFL).

A Geelong Under-19s player, Bolton was recruited to Woodville by coach Rodney Olsson and he performed well in his three years at the club. Bolton, who played as a wingman, joined Geelong in 1984 and made his debut in the opening game of the season.

Sydney acquired his services in 1986, the same year he represented Australia in the International Rules series against the touring Irish team. He was a member of the Sydney squad which placed second in the 1986 home and away season, only to fall away in the finals. Bolton participated in another rare finals series for the club in 1987. During his career he represented South Australia, New South Wales and Victoria at interstate football.

Bolton later coached Strathmerton Football Club.

References

Holmesby, Russell and Main, Jim (2007). The Encyclopedia of AFL Footballers. 7th ed. Melbourne: Bas Publishing.

1960 births
Living people
Geelong Football Club players
Sydney Swans players
Woodville Football Club players
Australian rules footballers from Victoria (Australia)
Grovedale Football Club players
South Australian State of Origin players
New South Wales Australian rules football State of Origin players
Australia international rules football team players